No. 181 Squadron RAF was a Royal Air Force Squadron formed as a fighter-bomber unit in World War II.

History

Formation

The squadron formed on 25 August 1942 at RAF Duxford and was supplied with Hurricane and Typhoon aircraft. The squadron operated the Typhoons from several locations in the United Kingdom including RAF Appledram, RAF Snailwell, RAF Lasham, RAF Odiham and RAF Hurn. The squadron attacked V-1 flying bomb launch sites and supported the Normandy landings in June 1944, then moved to France where it followed the Allied advance across Europe, seeking targets of opportunity. The squadron disbanded in Lübeck, Germany on 30 September 1945.

Aircraft operated

References

External links

 History of No.'s 181–185 Squadrons at RAF Web
 181 Squadron history on the official RAF website

181
Military units and formations established in 1942